The 1989 NCAA Division II women's basketball tournament was the eighth annual tournament hosted by the NCAA to determine the national champion of Division II women's  collegiate basketball in the United States.

Delta State defeated Cal Poly Pomona in the championship game, 88–58, claiming the Lady Statesmen's first NCAA Division II national title.

The championship rounds were contested in Cleveland, Mississippi.

A third-place game returned to the tournament this year after a six-year absence.

Regionals

East - Bloomsburg, Pennsylvania
Location: E.H. Nelson Fieldhouse Host: Bloomsburg State College of Pennsylvania

Northeast - New Haven, Connecticut
Location: North Campus Gymnasium Host: University of New Haven

West - Pomona, California
Location: Kellogg Gym Host: California State Polytechnic University, Pomona

Great Lakes - Rochester, Michigan
Location: Lepley Sports Center Host: Oakland University

South - Cleveland, Mississippi
Location: Walter Sillers Coliseum Host: Delta State University

South Atlantic - Hampton, Virginia
Location: Holland Hall Host: Hampton University

North Central - Fargo, North Dakota
Location: Bison Sports Arena Host: North Dakota State University

South Central - Warrensburg, Missouri
Location: CMSU Fieldhouse Host: Central Missouri State University

National Finals - Cleveland, Mississippi
Final Four Location: Walter Sillers Coliseum Host: Delta State University

All-tournament team
 Pam Lockett, Delta State
 Jo Lynn Davis, Delta State
 Niki Bracken, Cal Poly Pomona
 Lori Bender, Bentley
 Tammy Wilson, Central Missouri State

See also
 1989 NCAA Division II men's basketball tournament
 1989 NCAA Division I women's basketball tournament
 1989 NCAA Division III women's basketball tournament
 1989 NAIA women's basketball tournament

References
 1989 NCAA Division II women's basketball tournament jonfmorse.com

 
NCAA Division II women's basketball tournament
1989 in sports in Mississippi